Cory Ann Avants-Dockins (born January 22, 1985) is a former professional tennis player from the United States.

Biography
Born in Hawaii, Avants grew up in North Carolina, coached in tennis by her parents Hank and Sharon. A right-handed player, she had both a two-handed forehand and backhand.

Avants won her first ITF title at Raleigh in 2000.

From 2001 she competed as a professional and reached the final round of qualifying at the 2001 US Open, before having to retire hurt with a knee injury.

As a wildcard she featured in WTA Tour main draws at Los Angeles in 2001 and the Miami Open the following year.

She continued to compete in juniors, making the quarterfinals of the girls' singles at the 2002 Wimbledon Championships and the semi-finals of the 2003 US Open as a qualifier, which included a win over Ana Ivanovic.

In 2004 she reached her career best ranking of 226 in the world and won her second ITF title, the Houston Pro Tennis Classic.

Avants qualified for the main draw of the WTA Tournament in Cincinnati in 2005.

ITF finals

Singles (2–1)

Doubles (1–5)

References

External links
 
 

1985 births
Living people
American female tennis players
Tennis people from North Carolina
21st-century American women